The Copa del Generalísimo 1956 Final was the 54th final of the King's Cup. The final was played at Estadio Chamartín in Madrid, on 24 June 1956, being won by Atlético de Bilbao, who beat Atlético de Madrid 2–1.

Details

See also
Same finalists:
1921 Copa del Rey Final
1985 Copa del Rey Final
2012 UEFA Europa League Final

References

1956
Copa
Atlético Madrid matches
Athletic Bilbao matches